Lucas Arnold and Tomás Carbonell won in the final 5–7, 7–5, 7–6(7–5) against Mariano Hood and Sebastián Prieto.

Seeds

  Pablo Albano /  Jaime Oncins (first round)
  Lucas Arnold /  Tomás Carbonell (champions)
  Gastón Etlis /  Martín Rodríguez (semifinals)
  Cristian Brandi /  Daniel Orsanic (semifinals)

Draw

External links
 Copa AT&T Main Draw

ATP Buenos Aires
2001 ATP Tour
ATP